This is a list of notable authorities, agencies and similar bodies that are responsible for investigating or responding to complaints about police.

Asia

Hong Kong
Independent Police Complaints Council

India
 Police Complaints Authority (India)

Russia
 Investigative Committee of Russia

South Korea
 National Police Commission (South Korea)

Africa

South Africa
 Independent Police Investigative Directorate

Europe

Ireland
 Garda Síochána Ombudsman Commission

Sweden
 Swedish Police Authority

United Kingdom

England and Wales
 Independent Office for Police Conduct (2018 – present)
 Independent Police Complaints Commission (2004–2018)
 Police Complaints Authority (United Kingdom) (1985–2004)
 Police Complaints Board (1977–1985)

Northern Ireland
 Northern Ireland Policing Board

Scotland
 Police Complaints Commissioner for Scotland (2007–2013)
 Police Investigations and Review Commissioner (2013 – present)

Georgia 
 The State Inspector Service (2019 – present)

North America

Canada

National
 Civilian Review and Complaints Commission for the Royal Canadian Mounted Police
 Military Police Complaints Commission

Provincial

Alberta
 Alberta Serious Incident Response Team

British Columbia
 Independent Investigations Office

Nova Scotia
 Serious Incident Response Team

Ontario

Province-wide
 Office of the Independent Police Review Director
 Ontario Civilian Police Commission
 Special Investigations Unit

Local
 Toronto Police Services Board
 York Region Police Services Board

United States

Local
 Nashville, Tennessee – Nashville Community Oversight Board
 New York City, New York – Civilian Complaint Review Board
 Los Angeles, California – Coalition Against Police Abuse (unofficial community organisation)

Oceania

Australia

National
 Australian Commission for Law Enforcement Integrity
 Australian Defence Force Investigative Service

New South Wales
 Independent Commission Against Corruption (New South Wales)
 Police Integrity Commission

Queensland
 Crime and Corruption Commission

Western Australia
 Corruption and Crime Commission

New Zealand
 Independent Police Conduct Authority

See also 
 Cop Block
 Copwatch
 Police authority
 Police board

References

Lists of organizations
 
Oversight and watchdog organizations